The Runes of Zendos is a 1984 video game published by Dorcas Software. It is the sequel to The Oracle's Cave.

Gameplay
The Runes of Zendos is a game in which the happy principality of Dorcasia is overrun by the wicked wizard of Zendos, and the player must rescue the imprisoned twelve months.

Reception
D J Robinson reviewed The Runes of Zendos for Imagine magazine, and stated that "Runes of Zendos is one step beyond Dorcas' last release. By incorporating traditional adventure features with their own unique ideas, they have managed to produce a very good game."

Reviews
Crash! - Jan, 1985

References

External links
Text of additional reviews listed at Spectrum Computing

1984 video games
Action-adventure games
Platform games
Video game sequels
Video games developed in the United Kingdom
ZX Spectrum games
ZX Spectrum-only games